Lyria guionneti is a species of sea snail, a marine gastropod mollusk in the family Volutidae, the volutes.

Description

Distribution
This marine species occurs off New Caledonia.

References

 Poppe, G. & Conde, J., 2001. A new species of Lyria (Gastropoda: Volutidae) from New Caledonian waters. Novapex 2(3): 115-117

External links
 MNHN, Paris: holotype

Volutidae
Gastropods described in 2001